"Petticoats of Portugal" is a popular song with music and lyrics by Michael A. Durso, Mel Mitchell and Murl Kahn. One of the best-known versions of this song was recorded by Dick Jacobs and His Orchestra in 1956, and released by Coral Records (Coral 61724) on a single along with "Song of the Vagabonds - Only A Rose".

Other notable recordings
Billy Vaughn (1956)
Florian ZaBach
Bert Kaempfert (1959; on his April In Portugal album)

References

Songs about Portugal
1956 singles
1956 songs